Swathi Muthu is a 2003 Indian Kannada-language drama film directed by D. Rajendra Babu and written by K. Vishwanath. This film starred Sudeep and Meena. It is an official remake of Telugu film Swati Mutyam (1986).

Plot
Shivaiah (Sudeep), an autistic, lives in a village with his grandmother. All he is good at is obeying his trusted grandmother. In an attempt to do good to Lalitha (Meena), a destitute young widow with a 5-year-old son, marries Shivaiah during an auspicious village festival.

The villagers are shocked and try to harm him as his act goes against traditional societal norms. In the meantime, Shivaiah's grandmother dies. Lalitha wants to save her new husband's life and so moves with him and her son to a city in search of better prospects. With support from a few of their acquaintances, the family of three settle down.

Life for them, thereafter, looks good and promising. Lalitha begins to appreciate Shivaiah's innocence and warmth. She grows closer to him and eventually bears him a son. Years pass, the children grow up, and then Lalitha breathes her last. Shivaiah lives with her memories for a long time. At the end, he is seen leaving his old house in the company of his children and grandchildren, carrying with him a tulsi plant which symbolizes his memories of Lalitha.

Cast
 Sudeep as Shivaiah
 Meena as Lalitha
 Kishan Shrikanth as Krishnamurthy
 Leelavathi
Bharath Bhagavathar 
Sanketh Kashi
Pavithra Lokesh
B. V. Radha 
Pruthviraj 
M. S. Umesh 
Doddanna
Bank Janardhan
Sadashiva Brahmavar 
Ramakrishna 
Lokanath Uncle 
Mandeep Roy 
Pramila joshai 
Sarigama Viji

Soundtrack

The soundtrack was composed by Rajesh Ramanath which has been reused from the original songs composed by Ilaiyaraaja.

Awards

Filmfare Awards South
 Best Actor - Kannada - Sudeep
 Best Actress - Kannada - Meena

Film Fan's Association Awards
 Best Actor - Kannada - Sudeep

Hello Gandhinagara Awards
 Special Award - Sudeep

References

External links
 
 
 

2003 films
2000s Kannada-language films
Films scored by V. Ravichandran
Kannada remakes of Telugu films
Indian drama films
Films about autism
Films about widowhood in India
Films directed by D. Rajendra Babu
2003 drama films